Maurice King is a former Barbadan weightlifter.

Marville represented the British West Indies at the 1959 Pan American Games in Chicago, USA, taking bronze in the Middleweight division. He was the lone Barbadan on the weightlifting team. 
.

References

Pan American Games bronze medalists for the British West Indies
Weightlifters at the 1959 Pan American Games
Medalists at the 1959 Pan American Games
Pan American Games medalists in weightlifting